Erika Jänkä (born 23 November 1995 in Perho, Finland) is a Finnish biathlete.

References

1995 births
Living people
Finnish female biathletes
Biathletes at the 2012 Winter Youth Olympics
Biathletes at the 2022 Winter Olympics
Olympic biathletes of Finland
People from Perho
Sportspeople from Central Ostrobothnia